Joseph Patrick Addabbo Jr. (born May 13, 1964) is an American politician, a Democratic member of the New York State Senate from the 15th district representing Howard Beach, Ozone Park, Woodhaven, Glendale, Middle Village, Maspeth and parts of South Ozone Park, Ridgewood, Woodside and The Rockaways.

Life and career 
Addabbo was born in 1964, the youngest child of Congressman Joseph Patrick Addabbo, Sr., and Grace Addabbo. He attended Nativity BVM School in Ozone Park and Archbishop Molloy High School, graduating in 1982. He later received degrees from St. John's University (1986) and Touro Law School. His father, Joseph P. Addabbo Sr., served 13 terms in the United States House of Representatives.

Addabbo practiced law for ten years at Addabbo and Greenberg before being elected to the 32nd district of the New York City Council in 2001. He was re-elected three times and served as a council member for eight years. Addabbo and his wife, Dawn, have two daughters, Alexis and Arianna.

Addabbo is a resident of the Tudor Village section of Ozone Park.

New York Senate 
By 2008, Republican state Senator Serphin R. Maltese had served the southern Queens district for ten terms, despite the district leaning Democratic. Facing term limits in the Council in 2009, Addabbo decided to challenge Maltese. In a good year for Democrats, Addabbo defeated Maltese 57% to 43%. While the district is more competitive than others in Queens, Addabbo has never won re-election by less than ten points, beating Councilman Anthony Como in 2010, Councilman Eric Ulrich in 2012, and Republican Michael Conigliaro in 2014. He did not face serious challenges in 2016 or 2018.

On June 24, 2011, Addabbo supported gay marriage by voting for the "Marriage Equality Enactment" Bill# A-8354, which successfully passed in the Senate. This vote was a change in position, as Addabbo had been one of a handful of Democratic votes against marriage equality that defeated a similar bill in 2009.

In the Senate, Addabbo serves as the Chair of the Senate Racing, Gaming and Wagering Committee.

See also
 2009 New York State Senate leadership crisis

References

External links
 New York State Senate: Joseph P. Addabbo Jr.
 NYS Senate Campaign website
 Joseph Addabbo and Serphin Maltese battling hard for state Senate seat. New York Daily News. 2008-08-10.

Democratic Party New York (state) state senators
New York City Council members
Touro Law Center alumni
St. John's University (New York City) alumni
1964 births
Living people
21st-century American politicians
People from Ozone Park, Queens
Archbishop Molloy High School alumni